Basketball at the 2010 Summer Youth Olympics was contested by 20 teams each in the boys' and girls' tournament. The tournaments followed the FIBA 3x3 rules and was held at the Youth Space, Singapore.

Major rules
 Only half of the basketball court is used for the game.
 Each team consists of 3 players and 1 substitute.
 Game time: Two 5-minute periods or a team scores 33 points or more, whichever comes first. If tied at the end of regulation, 2-minute overtimes are used until the tie is broken or a team reaches 33 points.
 Team must attempt a shot for goal in 10 seconds.
 Ball must be taken out of the 3-point line and touched by 2 teammates (ball receiver/dribbler and 1 other teammate) before a shot can be attempted.

Fixtures and results
The group stage draw was made on 31 May 2010.

Medal summary

Participating teams

Boys

Girls

References

 
2010
Basketball
2010 in 3x3 basketball
International basketball competitions hosted by Singapore
2010–11 in Singaporean basketball